Dreaming Creek is a stream in Lynchburg, Virginia, in the United States. It is a branch of the James River.

See also
List of rivers of Virginia

References

Lynchburg, Virginia
Rivers of Virginia